The Kiwalik River is a stream on the Seward Peninsula in the U.S. state of Alaska. The headwaters of the river originate in the eastern portion of the peninsula, around Granite Mountain.  The river flows north to its mouth at Kiwalik Lagoon, Chukchi Sea. The start of the 20th century mining town of Candle is found on its western bank at the confluence of Candle Creek. The ore minerals and materials found in the river basin are galena, gold, pyrite, scheelite, silver and sphalerite, and the primary commodities are tungsten, lead and zinc.

Etymology
The Inuit name, published by the British Admiralty, about 1880 on Chart 593, was spelled "Kee-wa-lik."

Geography
The Kiwalik River flows on the north side of Seward Peninsula. Beyond the Candle, it forms into a lagoon. The lagoon consists of vast areas of mud flats that get exposed during low tide.

Tributaries
The river has many tributaries that emerge from the west and form narrow basins with long and low ridges forming the dividing line; these tributaries are: Canoe Creek, Gold Run, and Glacier, Dome, Bonanza, Eldorado, Candle Creek, and Minnehaha creeks. Another important stream, which provides for water supply needs of the town, is the Glacier Creek which originates from the eastern slope of Monument Mountain, which is the highest peak in the Fairhaven district. The water resource is from limestone springs during the low flow season, which increases substantially from glacial melt during the season.

This stream is also sourced by springs but its flows are not comparable to that of Glacier Creek; the discharge of these two steams together, as reported in the summer of 1909 during the low flow season, was only of the order of /sec. Even in respect of other streams in the vicinity, there is very little flow during lean season.

From the eastern part of the Kiwalik River basin, the streams emanating from the east are the Quartz and Hunter creeks. A thin layer of moss covers the floor of the basin. The hill slopes are steep and precipitation drains out fast over the river bed which consists of loose gravel. Other streams that flow through the basin and which join the Quartz Creek are the Hunter Creek and Bear Creek; the former creek has lesser flows compared to Quartz Creek. Lava Creek, another small tributary from the east that drains a flat lava area in the north of Hunter Creek, has high runoff during the rainy months. The banks of the river and the creeks are lined with spruce and also willow vegetation, in specific stretches.

History
This feature did not permit diversion of river water for mining to adopt hydraulicking procedure, particularly when the Alaska gold mining was at its peak. Hence, the Candle-Alaska Hydraulic Gold Mining Company excavated a ditch (an unlined canal), in  1907, to collect water from Glacier and Dome creeks, and to convey it to a location near Candle to facilitate mining the gold-bearing gravels of Candle Creek. To cater to the needs of the low flow season, when the streams (Quartz and Hunter creek to Candle Creek)  carried low flows, an additional canal was constructed during the summers of 1908 and 1909 to facilitate the  hydraulicking process of mining.

Gold and other minerals
Kiwalik River is the third largest river in the region which cuts across the gold belt, and its tributary the Candle Creek holds gold deposits which were reported to be economical for extraction. Candle Creek and the town of candle close by have maximum extraction locations with the operations extensively carried out by the Arctic Circle Explorations Inc. Dredging was also carried out in the bed of the Kiwalik River for gold which was not successful. Gold placers were also located in the Quartz Creek. Uranium concentrations of more than 0.025% of equivalent uranium has also been found in the placers of the headwaters of the tributaries of the Kiwalik River.

Candle on the Kiwalik Creek saw the gold rush in 1901 and 1906 and became the central Placer Gold District, when the population in the town was about 546; by about 1938 it had declined to 85 with the end of the gold rush. It was booming gold mining town

See also
List of rivers of Alaska

References

Rivers of Northwest Arctic Borough, Alaska
Rivers of the Seward Peninsula
Drainage basins of the Chukchi Sea
Rivers of Alaska